Howard Crosby Butler (March 7, 1872 Croton Falls, New York – August 13, 1922 Neuilly) was an American archaeologist. Butler graduated from Princeton University, and later pursued special studies at the Columbia School of Architecture and at the American School of Classical Studies in Rome and in Athens. In 1899, 1904, and 1909, he was at the head of archaeological expeditions in Syria. He became professor of the history of architecture at Princeton in 1905. Turkey's unsolicited request that he oversee the excavation of Sardis represented a rare distinction for an American and a Christian. He directed five seasons of archaeological work at Sardis from 1910 to 1914, interrupted by the World War I. Most of the resulting finds kept in the excavation house perished in the Greco-Turkish War of 1919–22, thwarting the publication of projected volumes on pottery, lamps, bronze and stone objects, ivories, bones and glass. Butler became unwell on August 11, 1922 after returning from Sardis, via Naples. He was admitted to the American Hospital of Paris in Neuilly on August 13 and died that night.

Works
He wrote many articles for archaeological journals and notable books on Scotland's Ruined Abbeys (1900) and The Story of Athens (1902). Expedition documents include “Architecture,” Part II of Publications of American Expedition to Syria (1903) and “Ancient Architecture in Syria,” in Division II of Publications of Princeton Expedition to Syria.

References

1872 births
1922 deaths
American archaeologists
Princeton University alumni
Princeton University faculty